Reginald Butts (born 1855, date of death unknown) was a Guyanese cricketer. He played in eight first-class matches for British Guiana from 1883 to 1911.

See also
 List of Guyanese representative cricketers

References

External links
 

1855 births
Year of death missing
Guyanese cricketers
Guyana cricketers
Place of birth missing